KXZY-LP (100.7 FM) is a radio station. It is licensed to Waco, Texas, United States. The station is owned by Primera Asamblea De Dios.

References

External links
 

Radio stations in Waco, Texas
Low-power FM radio stations in Texas
XZY-LP